This is a list of defunct airlines from Austria.

See also

 List of airlines of Austria
 List of airports in Austria

References

Austria
Airlines
Airlines, defunct